"Rosana" is a song by American rapper Wax. It was originally featured on Wax's mixtape Eviction Notice in November 2011. It was later released as a single in July 2012 but failed to chart. It also featured on the album Continue. The song was released throughout Europe in March 2013, and reached number one in Austria while peaking in the top ten in Germany and Switzerland. Rosana was produced by Nobody Famous.

Music video
The video was published on YouTube in July 2012. It features Melissa Soria as Rosana, and was directed by Casey Chan. The concept of the video was brought up by Wax and Casey Chan. The video has Wax meeting a girl and starting a relationship together, while the viewer watches them in several scenes involving sexual innuendo.

Charts

Weekly charts

Year-end charts

Release history

References

2012 singles
2012 songs
Number-one singles in Austria